Table tennis was contested at the 2015 Summer Universiade from July 6 to 13 at the Jangseong Hong Gil-Dong Gymnasium in Jangseong, South Korea. Men's and women's singles, men's and women's team, and men's, women's, and mixed doubles events was contested.

Medal summary

Medal table

Events

References

External links
2015 Summer Universiade – Table tennis

2015
2015 in table tennis
2015 Summer Universiade events